Gnorimoschema sporomochla is a moth in the family Gelechiidae. It was described by Edward Meyrick in 1929. It is found in North America, where it has been recorded from Texas.

The wingspan is about 12 mm. The forewings are uniform ochreous brown with three irregular transverse streaks formed of black scales with whitish tips, not reaching the costa or dorsum, at about one-third, the middle, and two-thirds, the third undefined, followed by some scattered whitish scales. There are some irregular black-white-tipped scales strewn along the posterior half of the costal edge, and from before the tornus along the termen to the apex. The hindwings are light bluish grey.

References

Gnorimoschema
Moths described in 1929